Dala-Floda or Floda is a locality situated in Gagnef Municipality, Dalarna County, Sweden with 680 inhabitants in 2010.

Dala-Floda is a small village, with a few shops and a reasonably sized park.

References 

Populated places in Dalarna County
Populated places in Gagnef Municipality